The following is a list of mayors of Pietermaritzburg, South Africa. The British dominated Pietermaritzburg government until the second half of the 20th century. National white minority rule in South Africa ended in 1994. When the Msunduzi Local Municipality formed circa 2001, its mayoralty included Pietermaritzburg.

 D. D. Buchanan, 1854
 D. B. Scott, 1855
 P. Ferreira, 1856
 W. Leathern and G. Thompson, 1857
 J. Archbell, 1858, 1860-1863
 John William Ackerman, 1859
 E. Tomlinson, 1864-1866, 1870
 S. Williams, 1867-1869, 1882
 J. Russom, 1869
 W. George, 1870-1871
 P. Davis, Sr., 1872-1873, 1879
 Henry Pepworth, 1874
 John Fleming, 1875-1876
 W. Francis, 1877-1878
 A. W. Kershaw, 1880
 John Roseveare, 1881
 H. Griffin, 1883
 E. Owen, 1884-1885
 J. J. Chapman, 1886-1888
 E. S. T. Stantial, 1889
 W.E. Bale, 1890, 1893
 Richard Mason, 1891-1892
 P. Carbis, 1894
 C. G. Levy, 1895
 P. F. Payn, 1896
 T. W. Woodhouse, 1897
 George James Macfarlane, circa 1898-1901 
 W.J. O'Brien, circa 1905 
 ?
 H. Collins, circa 1934
 ?

Msunduzi Local Municipality
 Hloni Glenford Zondi, circa 2000-2006 
 Zanele Hlatshwayo, 2006-2010 
 Mike Tarr, May 2010-? 
 Chris Ndlela, 2011-2016 
 Themba Njilo, 2016-2019
 Mzimkhulu Thebolla, 2019–present

See also
 Pietermaritzburg history and timeline
 Msunduzi Local Municipality, est. circa 2001
 British Colony of Natal, 1843–1910
 Union of South Africa (British dominion), 1910–1961

References

Pietermaritzburg